Ing. Oľga Algayerová, MBA, M.A. (born 13 October 1959) is a Slovak diplomat and the Executive Secretary of the United Nations Economic Commission for Europe. She replaced Christian Friis Bach of Denmark.

Education 
Algayerová is a graduate of the University of Malta and the Open University Business School and holds a master's degree in contemporary diplomacy and an Engineer of Economy diploma from Business Faculty of the University of Economics in Bratislava.

Career
Prior to her diplomatic career, Algayerová worked in the private sector as Corporate Export Manager at Zentiva International from 2004 to 2006. From 2010 to 2012, she held the position of President of the Slovak Millennium Development Goals. From 2006 to 2010, she was State Secretary in the Ministry of Foreign Affairs.

Before her appointment on 13 April 2017 by United Nations Secretary-General António Guterres, Algayerová was the Permanent Representative of Slovakia to the International Organizations in Vienna.

Other activities
 International Gender Champions (IGC), Member

References

Slovak officials of the United Nations
Living people
1959 births
University of Malta alumni